Margaret J. Winkler Mintz (April 22, 1895 – June 21, 1990) was a key figure in silent animation history, having a crucial role to play in the histories of Max and Dave Fleischer, Pat Sullivan, Otto Messmer, and Walt Disney. She was the first woman to produce and distribute animated films. Winkler was the subject of a feature film Walt Before Mickey.

Early life and career 
Hungarian-born of German descent, Winkler began her career as the personal secretary of Harry Warner, one of the founders of Warner Brothers. Through most of the silent era, Warner Brothers was strictly a film distributor, and Harry Warner was the man who made the deals. In 1917, Warner Brothers began distributing cartoons of Mutt and Jeff in New York and New Jersey. Warner was impressed with Winkler's talents.

In 1921, Winkler founded M.J. Winkler Pictures (later Screen Gems) and signed a contract with Pat Sullivan Productions to produce Felix the Cat cartoons. The following year she signed another contract to distribute for Fleischer Studios on the Out of the Inkwell series. This established her reputation as the top distributor in the cartoon world. It was a good thing, because at the end of the same year the Fleischer brothers, flush with success as a result of Winkler's work, left her to form their own distribution company, Red Seal Pictures. However much Sullivan helped Winkler's business, he and Winkler were constantly fighting. In September 1923, the renewal of his contract came up, and his unrealistic demands meant M.J. Winkler Pictures might have to survive for a while without its biggest star. Winkler viewed a pilot reel, called Alice's Wonderland (1923), submitted by then neophyte animator Walt Disney, the first entry in the Alice Comedies series. Winkler was intrigued with the idea of a live-action girl in a cartoon world, and signed Disney to a year-long contract despite the fact that Laugh-O-Gram Studio, the studio that made the cartoon, was now bankrupt.
Disney subsequently formed a new studio, Disney Brothers Cartoon Studio, which was the first cartoon studio in Hollywood and eventually changed its name to Walt Disney Productions. Disney was helped by the tutelage of Winkler, who insisted on editing all of the "Alice Comedies" episodes herself. One of her suggestions was the addition of a suspiciously Felix-like character called Julius. This was apparently the "straw that broke the camel's back" for Sullivan, who signed with rival distributor E. W. Hammons of Educational Pictures in 1925.

Winkler was the first female member of the Motion Picture Producer's Guild. To disguise her gender, she would sign letters "M.J. Winkler."

Marriage 
In 1924, she married Charles B. Mintz, a film distributor who had been working for her since 1922. Soon after she had her first child and retired from the business, turning her company over to her husband who renamed it Winkler Productions in 1926. The couple had two children, Katherine and William. The company was eventually renamed Screen Gems.

Death 
Winkler died on June 21, 1990 in Mamaroneck, New York. She was 95 years old.

References

Sources 
 John Canemaker; Felix: The Twisted Tale of the World's Most Famous Cat; Pantheon Books;  (1991)
 Donald Crafton; Before Mickey: The Animated Film, 1898–1928; University of Chicago Press;  (2nd edition, paperback, 1993)
 Denis Gifford; American Animated Films: The Silent Era, 1897–1929; McFarland & Company;  (library binding, 1990)
 Leonard Maltin; Of Mice and Magic: A History of American Animated Cartoons; Penguin Books;  (1980, 1987)
 Russell Merritt and J. B. Kaufman; Walt in Wonderland: The Silent Films of Walt Disney; Johns Hopkins University Press;  (paperback, 1993)

1895 births
1990 deaths
20th-century American businesspeople
20th-century American businesswomen
American film producers
American animated film producers
American film studio executives
American people of German descent
Hungarian emigrants to the United States
Film distributors (people)
Place of birth missing
American women animators
Screen Gems
Burials at Hollywood Forever Cemetery